Mayo was an electoral district which returned an MLA to the Legislative Assembly of the Yukon Territory in Canada. It was created in 1928, at a time when it was one of three districts who elected advisors to the Yukon Territorial Council. The more contemporary, final iteration of the riding was created from an amalgamation of the riding with part of the riding of Klondike. It was abolished in 1992 when it was amalgamated with the riding of Tatchun to form the riding of Mayo-Tatchun.

The district included the communities of Mayo, Keno, Elsa, and Stewart Crossing along the Silver Trail. At the time, it was one of the Yukon's nine rural ridings and was bordered by the ridings of Tatchun, Klondike, and Campbell.

It was situated on the traditional territory of the Selkirk First Nation and the First Nation of Na-Cho Nyäk Dun. As of 1970, the population of the electorate was 476 voters and by abolition (c. 1992) it was 421 voters.

History

Mayo was created as a district in the 1928 Yukon election at a time when representatives for the Yukon Territorial Council were being elected. The Yukon Territorial Council was the Yukon's political body prior to the creation of the Yukon Legislative Assembly. Although not a full legislature, the council acted as an advisory body to the Commissioner of the Yukon, and had the power to pass non-binding motions of legislation which would be forwarded to the Commissioner for consideration. Because the Commissioner retained executive authority, empowered through Ottawa, the Yukon Territorial Council was thus not a fully democratic government. Although an elected body, its powers were significantly more constrained than those of a provincial legislative assembly.

When Mayo was created in 1928, it was one of three districts with representatives on the Yukon Territorial Council along with Dawson and Whitehorse.

When partisan politics was introduced to the Yukon in the 1978 election, Mayo was one of the initial electoral districts, its communities of Mayo, Elsa, Stewart Crossing, and Keno forming the centre of much of the Yukon's mining production. Elsa at one point was the 2nd largest producer of silver in Canada and the 4th largest in the world. Keno was also known for its silver and lead mining. However, in 1989 when United Keno Hill closed its mining operations in the area of Keno and Elsa, the communities essentially shut down. Keno maintains a small population of around 15-20 people, while Elsa is abandoned. Both are maintained as sites of historical significance.

Mayo is also the former seat of New Democrat MLA Piers McDonald who became Premier of the Yukon in 1996. He ran in the Whitehorse riding of McIntyre-Takhini when Mayo was dissolved into Mayo-Tatchun in 1992.

MLAs

Electoral results

1989 general election

|-

| NDP
| Piers McDonald
| align="right"| 210
| align="right"| 62.3%
| align="right"| +6.9%
|-

|-

| Liberal
| Wilf Tuck
| align="right"| 34
| align="right"| 10.1%
| align="right"| +6.1%
|-
! align left colspan=3|Total
! align=right| 337
! align=right| 100.0%
! align=right| –
|}

1985 general election

|-

| NDP
| Piers McDonald
| align="right"| 251
| align="right"| 55.4%
| align="right"| +3.1%
|-

|-

| Liberal
| Rob Andison
| align="right"| 18
| align="right"| 4.0%
| align="right"| -4.0%
|-
! align left colspan=3|Total
! align=right| 453
! align=right| 100.0%
! align=right| –
|}

1982 general election

|-

| NDP
| Piers McDonald
| align="right"| 230
| align="right"| 52.3%
| align="right"| +29.1%
|-

|-

| Liberal
| Eleanor Van Bibber
| align="right"| 35
| align="right"| 8.0%
| align="right"| -16.0%
|-
! align left colspan=3|Total
! align=right| 440
! align=right| 100.0%
! align=right| –
|}

1978 general election

|-

|-

| Independent
| David Harwood
| align="right"| 84
| align="right"| 23.7%
| align="right"| –
|-

| Liberal
| Gordon McIntyre
| align="right"| 85
| align="right"| 24.0%
| align="right"| –
|-

| NDP
| Alan H. McDiarmid
| align="right"| 82
| align="right"| 23.2%
| align="right"| –
|-
! align left colspan=3|Total
! align=right| 354
! align=right| 100.0%
! align=right| –
|}
Partisan politics introduced into the territory

1974 general election

|-

| Independent
| Gordon McIntyre
| align="right"| 199
| align="right"| 55.3%
| align="right"| –
|-

| Independent
| V.B.P. Mills
| align="right"| 154
| align="right"| 42.3%
| align="right"| –
|-
! align=left colspan=3|Total
! align=right| 360
! align=right| 100.0%
! align=right| –
|}

1970 general election

|-

| Independent
| Ronald Rivett
| align="right"| 248
| align="right"| 68.1%
| align="right"| –
|-

| Independent
| George Dobson
| align="right"| 69
| align="right"| 19.0%
| align="right"| –
|-

| Independent
| G. Jaen Gordon
| align="right"| 46
| align="right"| 12.6%
| align="right"| –
|-
! align=left colspan=3|Total
! align=right| 364
! align=right| 100.0%
! align=right| –
|}

References 

Former Yukon territorial electoral districts